Nancy Jewel McDonie (born April 13, 2000), known professionally as Nancy, is a Korean-American singer, actress, and host. She is a former member of the South Korean girl group Momoland, which was formed on November 10, 2016, through the Mnet's reality survival show Finding Momoland.

Early life
Nancy's father, Richard Jowel McDonie is from Columbus, Ohio, and served in the United States Army for twenty years. In the 1990s he was promoted to Colonel and stationed in Korea.  He went on a blind date with Lee Myeong-ju, a Korean woman, originally from Yongin, Gyeonggi-do, who was volunteering at the base, and they soon married. In November 1998 their first child, later to become a cellist, Brenda, was born, and on April 13, 2000 the second daughter, Nancy, was born in Daegu, South Korea.  In 2001 the family moved to the father's hometown of Columbus, Ohio, where Nancy spent her early years and attended school. in Nam-gu, Daegu, South Korea. In an interview about her being of mixed origin and the product of two cultures Nancy said, "I have always been told by my parents that there are two cultures that I am in contact with ever since I was a child."

On March 20, 2019, it was reported that Nancy changed her Korean legal name to Lee Geu-roo from Lee Seung-ri.

Education
She graduated from Hanlim Multi Art School on February 9, 2018, where she was a student in the Musical Department.

Career

Pre-debut
Nancy auditioned in Korea's Got Talent as part of a hip-hop group called "Cutie Pies" in 2011. The group reached the semi-finals.

As a teenager, she appeared in several TV programs, including The Unlimited, and also participated in Mak Ee Rae Show: Just Do It Expedition in 2012, in which she traveled to the Philippines and Saipan with South Korean actress Kim Yoo-jung.

2016: Finding Momoland, debut with Momoland, and Sunny Girls

In 2016, Nancy became a contestant on Mnet's reality survival show Finding Momoland to select the members of MLD Entertainment's new girl group Momoland. She finished the competition in first place, and had her debut with the group on November 10, 2016, with the mini-album Welcome to Momoland. Momoland made their debut stage performing at M Countdown.

On November 19, it was announced that she would join Inkigayo's project girl group Sunny Girls along with GFriend's Eunha, WJSN's Cheng Xiao, Oh My Girl's YooA and Gugudan's Nayoung. They made their official debut at SBS's Inkigayo stage, on November 27, with the title track "Taxi". The group also performed at the 2016 SBS Gayo Daejeon on December 26.

2017–present: Acting activities and recognition 
In 2017, Nancy was cast in the lead role with boy band ZE:A member Ha Min-woo in Naver TV's web music drama series Some Light. Nancy and Ha Min-woo also collaborated for the theme song of the drama series.

Nancy was selected to host the music show The Power of K alongside U-Kwon and Shownu. The show began airing in Japan and Korea in January 2018.

In October 2018, Nancy appeared in episode 11 of MBC's Dae Jang Geum is Watching, alongside her fellow-members JooE, Hyebin and Daisy as idol trainees.

On January 3, 2018, Momoland released their third mini-album, Great!. As a result, the lead single, "Bboom Bboom", was a huge commercial success, reaching number two on the Gaon Digital Chart. On June 26, 2018, Momoland released their fourth mini-album Fun to the World with the lead single "Baam" becoming the 15th best-selling song of July 2018 on Gaon Music Chart.

On January 27, 2023, it was announced that Nancy, along with the Momoland members, departed from MLD Entertainment following expiration of the contracts. Momoland officially announced their disbandment on February 14. On March 4, Nancy announced that she signed a contract with Aria Diamond, a newly established talent agency affiliated with Aria Group, through her personal Instagram account.

Acting career
In the Philippines, ABS-CBN and Dreamscape Entertainment announced on October 4, 2019, that Nancy was to star in an upcoming new Filipino miniseries titled The Soulmate Project. Nancy will play her character Binna, a "Korean-American who lives in the Philippines." In an interview with ABS-CBN News in 2019, director and writer Antoinette Jadaone said that series will consist of 13 episodes and it will be "more akin to a Korean drama." she said, "It’s not like how we do teleseryes [in the Philippines] where you do it per script every day, with a weekly script," Nancy revealed that filming will also take part in her home country South Korea. Production for the project was slated to begin in 2020, but was postponed to 2021 due to the COVID-19 pandemic and the ABS-CBN shutdown and subsequent denial of its bid for a new legislative broadcast franchise. An omnibus trailer for the series was unveiled at the network's Christmas special on December 20, 2020, while new filming dates are yet to be released.

Other ventures

Endorsements
In January 2020, Nancy was chosen as the new endorsement model for the popular skincare brand "Some By Mi", A representative of Some By Mi said that they chose Nancy was because "her healthy and pure image fit well with the direction that we pursue, of our clean, natural skincare products".

Filmography

Television series

Web series

Television shows

Hosting

Discography

Soundtrack appearances

References

External links

 Official website 

2000 births
Living people
People from Daegu
21st-century South Korean women singers
21st-century South Korean actresses
South Korean female dancers
South Korean female idols
Momoland members
South Korean television actresses
South Korean web series actresses
American people of Irish descent
American people of South Korean descent
South Korean people of American descent
South Korean people of Irish descent
Hanlim Multi Art School alumni